The Stone Energy Corporation was an American oil and gas corporation based in Lafayette, Louisiana, USA. It was listed on the New York Stock Exchange under the listing SGY.  The demise of Stone Energy ultimately was the oilfield crash of 2016 which resulted in oil prices plummeting 60-$75 a barrel. Stone Energy was never able to fully recover from the 2016 crash due to bad drilling decisions from 2013 to 2016 and the resulting obligations from its attempt to test the waters of deepwater drilling.  Stone was predominantly known for platform acquisition and well rework, not for drilling.

Stone Energy was acquired by Houston, TX based company Talos Energy on May 10, 2018.

History
The Stone Energy Corporation was founded by James Hiram Stone in 1993. It operated in the Appalachian basin and the Gulf of Mexico.

References

Defunct oil companies of the United States
Companies based in Lafayette, Louisiana
Energy companies established in 1993
Non-renewable resource companies established in 1993
1993 establishments in Louisiana
Companies listed on the New York Stock Exchange